Euriphene larseni, or Larsen's nymph, is a butterfly in the family Nymphalidae. It is found in Ghana. The habitat consists of forests.

References

Butterflies described in 1994
Euriphene
Endemic fauna of Ghana
Butterflies of Africa